Poisonous amphibians are amphibians that produce toxins to defend themselves from predators.

Amphibians
Most toxic amphibians are poisonous to touch or eat. These amphibians usually sequester toxins from animals and plants on which they feed, commonly from poisonous insects or poisonous plants. Except certain salamandrid salamanders that can extrude sharp venom-tipped ribs, and two species of frogs with venom-tipped bone spurs on their skulls, amphibians are not known to actively inject venom.

Toxic Frogs and Toads 
An example of poison ingestion derives from the poison dart frog. They get a deadly chemical called lipophilic alkaloid from consuming a poisonous food in the rainforest. They are immune to the poison and they secrete it through their skin as a defense mechanism against predators. This poison is so efficient, the native people of the South American Amazon rainforest use the frogs' toxins on their weapons to kill their prey, giving the frogs their nickname the "poison dart frog".

Toxic Salamanders

Recreational ingestion of toxins
Some people use the bufotoxins of some species of toxic toads as a drug to get high, but this can become very dangerous. Usually due to the toads' size and toxicity, the poisons would not be deadly to a fully grown, healthy adult. But if too much of the toxin is absorbed, or if the person is young or ill, then the poisons can become a serious threat. It also depends on species: some amphibians do have toxins strong enough to kill even a healthy mature person within just a few minutes, while other species may not have toxins potent enough to have any effect. Licking toads is not biologically practical. For these tryptamines to be orally activated, the human monoamine oxidase system must be inhibited. Therefore, licking a poisonous amphibian will not guarantee a sufficient dose.

See also 
 Psychoactive toad
 Poisonous fish
 List of poisonous animals
 Toxic birds
 Venomous fish
 Venomous mammals
 Venomous snakes
 List of venomous animals

References

External links 
 Poisonous Frogs (Buzzle.com)

Amphibians
Vertebrate toxins
Poisonous animals